Holkham may refer to:

Holkham, the civil parish in Norfolk, England
Holkham Bay, part of the Inside Passage in Alaska
Holkham Hall, the Palladian home located on the Holkham Estate
Holkham National Nature Reserve, at Holkham